The PATCO Speedline, signed in Philadelphia as the Lindenwold Line and also known colloquially as the PATCO High Speed Line, is a rapid transit route operated by the Port Authority Transit Corporation (PATCO), which runs between Philadelphia, Pennsylvania and Camden County, New Jersey. The line runs underground in Philadelphia, crosses the Delaware River on the Benjamin Franklin Bridge, runs underground in Camden, then runs above ground to the east end of the line in Lindenwold, New Jersey. The Port Authority Transit Corporation and the Speedline are owned and operated by the Delaware River Port Authority. The line opened between Lindenwold and Camden on January 4, 1969 with the full line to Philadelphia opening a few weeks later on February 15, 1969.

The PATCO Speedline operates 24 hours a day, one of only a few U.S. mass transit systems to do so.

History

Philadelphia to Camden 

The present-day PATCO Speedline follows the route of several historical mainline railroad lines, some dating back to the 19th century. These railroads all terminated in Camden, where passengers could catch ferries across the Delaware River to Philadelphia. Early in the 20th century, the idea of a fixed Delaware River crossing connecting Camden and Philadelphia gained traction, and in 1919, the states of Pennsylvania and New Jersey formed the Delaware River Bridge Joint Commission to build a bridge between the two cities. The Delaware River Bridge (now the Benjamin Franklin Bridge) was designed to accommodate both rail and road traffic. When it opened on July 1, 1926, it had two outboard structures beside the main roadway for rail and space for two streetcar tracks (never installed) on the main road deck. Construction of the rail line did not begin until 1932, and the Bridge Line opened on June 7, 1936. Relatively short, it only had four stations: 8th Street and Franklin Square in Philadelphia, and City Hall and Broadway in Camden. Connection was available to the Pennsylvania-Reading Seashore Lines at Broadway.

In Philadelphia, the line joined the 1932-opened Broad-Ridge Spur just west of Franklin Square and shared its 8th Street/Market Street station. An underground tunnel continuing south following 8th Street then west following Locust Street to 18th Street, had been started in 1917 as part of plans for a Center City subway loop. The shell of this 8th–Locust Street subway was completed, but not outfitted for passenger service, in 1933. Beginning in June 1949, Bridge Line and Ridge Spur services were through-routed, providing one-seat service between Girard station and Camden. Construction on the 8th–Locust Street subway resumed in 1950. Bridge Line service was extended to 15–16th & Locust station, with intermediate stations at 12–13th & Locust station and 9–10th & Locust station, on February 14, 1953. This section is owned by the City of Philadelphia and leased by PATCO.

Extension to Lindenwold 

Despite the extension, Bridge Line ridership was limited by high fares and not extending east of Camden. In January 1954, due to low ridership on the extension, off-peak service and Saturday again began operating between Girard and Camden, with a shuttle train operating between 8th and 16th stations. Sunday service was suspended west of 8th Street at that time due to minimal usage. By 1962, only 1,900 daily passengers boarded the line west of 8th Street.

To facilitate the construction of extensions in Southern New Jersey, the states expanded the powers of the Delaware River Joint Commission (which owned the Benjamin Franklin Bridge and the New Jersey portion of the Bridge Line), rechristening it as the Delaware River Port Authority (DRPA) in 1951. The agency commissioned Parsons, Brinckerhoff, Hall & MacDonald to study possible rapid transit services for South Jersey; Parsons, Brinckerhoff's final report recommended building a new tunnel under the Delaware and three lines in New Jersey. Route A would run to Moorestown, Route B to Kirkwood (now Lindenwold), and Route C to Woodbury Heights. A later study by Louis T. Klauder & Associates recommended using the Bridge Line instead to reach Philadelphia and suggested building Route B first, as it had the highest potential ridership.

Over the weekend of August 23 to 27, 1968, the Ridge Spur was connected to a new upper-level terminal platform at 8th Street station to allow conversion of the Bridge Line into the "High-Speed Line". Bridge Line service was split into 16th Street–8th Street and 8th Street–Camden segments during the conversion, with a cross-platform transfer at 8th Street. Bridge Line service was suspended on December 29, 1968 for final conversion of the line. Service from Lindenwold station to Camden along former Pennsylvania-Reading Seashore Lines trackage began on January 4, 1969; full service into Center City Philadelphia over the bridge began on February 15, 1969. The Lindenwold extension cost $92 million.

An infill park and ride station, Woodcrest, was added on February 1, 1980, along with the PATCO II railcars. Ferry Avenue Local trains were replaced with Woodcrest Local trains on September 20, 1980.

Expansion proposals 
In 2005, PATCO officials began planning a new route in the corridor of the originally proposed Route C that would serve Gloucester County and end in Glassboro on the grounds of Rowan University (formerly Glassboro State College). On May 12, 2009, Jon Corzine, the Governor of New Jersey, formally endorsed a diesel light rail along an existing Conrail right-of-way, which was selected because of its lower capital cost and operating cost. The proposed Glassboro–Camden Line would require riders to transfer to the Speedline at the Walter Rand Transportation Center for trips to Philadelphia.

The 1936 Franklin Square station, closed since 1979, is scheduled to reopen in 2024. The project is budgeted at $29.3 million with construction expected to begin in 2021. The station will be updated to modern standards and accessibility with a surface structure planned at Franklin Square.

In 2021, the City of Philadelphia proposed a westward PATCO expansion to the rapidly-growing University City district via a new rail tunnel under the Schuylkill River. The 40th Street Trolley Portal was identified as a possible terminus, near the University of Pennsylvania and several major hospitals. A connection at Penn Medicine station would provide direct SEPTA Regional Rail transfers with the Media/Wawa Line to Delaware County, the Wilmington/Newark Line to Delaware, and the Airport Line to Philadelphia International Airport. Next steps include a feasibility study and cost estimate.

COVID-19 pandemic 
Westbound express service was also suspended. The four stations reopened on September 14, 2020, but express service remained suspended.

Trains and cars

Rolling stock 

PATCO originally operated 121  cars which were acquired in two separate orders, labeled PATCO I and PATCO II. The original PATCO I cars were designed and manufactured by Budd of Philadelphia in 1968. Cars numbered 101-125 were single units, and cars numbered 201-250 were in permanently coupled married pairs. The PATCO II cars were delivered in 1980 (in parallel with the opening of the Woodcrest Park and ride facility) and consisted of married pairs numbered 251-296. The PATCO II cars were manufactured by Vickers Canada under a license from Budd, but are nearly indistinguishable from the PATCO I's, the only differences being that the PATCO II cars had a fixed partition behind the operator's booth and lack a stainless steel shroud below the door line to ease access to traction components.

The single units differed from the married pairs by having an extra single leaf door located behind each operators booth. This was installed before the fare collection system was finalized and there was a possibility of operators collecting fares on board during the late night hours.

The PATCO I cars were originally fitted with WABCO Model N-2 MU couplers. Because of reliability issues these were replaced by Tomlinson type couplers manufactured by Ohio Brass Company. The original electrical system in the PATCO I cars was found to have certain reliability issues and was completely rebuilt to the PATCO II standard after the PATCO II cars arrived.

As built, the PATCO cars used camshaft resistance type motor controllers common to DC powered rapid transit vehicles up through the 1980s. The unique whine of the motors and gear assemblies can lead many to mistake the cars for using thyristor drive or even a variable-frequency drive, but this is not the case.  Bogies are of the Budd designed Pioneer III variety and while lightweight, provide for a very bouncy ride. The married pair cars shared a single motor control unit and automatic operation box. Many PATCO Car design features also appeared in the M1/M3 class of MU railcars for the Long Island Rail Road which provides for a similar riding experience.

Operation 

PATCO was one of the first transit systems to incorporate automatic train operation (ATO) for regular service. The PATCO ATO is an analog system that makes use of pulse code cab signaling supplied by Union Switch & Signal. The cab signals supply one of five different speeds (or full stop) and the on-board ATO gear will supply maximum acceleration or maximum braking force to reach that target speed. Automatic station stops are handled by track mounted transponders and can be overridden by the operator for non-stopping trains.

The system suffers from problems handling slippery track conditions and human operators are required to take control in any sort of precipitation. Because of the ATO limitations, drivers must make one trip per day under manual operation to stay in practice and are not penalized for running their trains manually at any time of their choosing. In practice, most operators prefer automatic operation as not only is it less effort, but it also tends to result in faster trips.

The system was designed for one-person operation by exclusively utilizing island platforms and right-handed operation with operators sitting on the left side of the vehicle where they can open their window and monitor the boarding process. Where trains have to use the "wrong" side, mirrors are provided to give the operator a proper view. Prior to the rebuild, the operator was not isolated from the passenger cabin, instead being surrounded by a low partition.  all of the legacy vehicles have been rebuilt with modern controls and full width cabs. Operators are still responsible for opening and closing the doors, sounding the horn, starting the train from station stops and manually operating the train when necessary. The rebuild also replaced the manual announcements with automated announcements.

PATCO runs the majority of its trains in 2-, 4- or 6-car configurations.  Before the Alstom rebuild, single-unit trains were occasionally seen late at night, while 3- or 5-car trains were encountered only when not enough cars are available to meet the service requirement.  All stations are capable of handling 7- or 8-car trains, but these lengths have never been run except for brief testing and for the annual holiday "Santa Train" special for children. In its first several decades, PATCO actively managed consist length between based on ridership levels as opposed to running trains in fixed sets, with single car trains making the occasional appearance overnight prior to the elimination of single cars as part of the rebuild.  Due to recent capital improvements, weekend and mid-day headways have grown, prompting PATCO to run 4 or 6 car trains during most off peak times, albeit less frequently than the 2-car trains and social distancing requirements of the COVID 19 pandemic further increased the use of 6-car trainsets during off-peak times.

Since December 2019 4-car (doors not open on the first and last cars) late night trains operate every 60 minutes instead of the previous schedule of every 45 minutes with a PATCO police officer reported to be onboard all trains from 12 a.m. to 4 a.m. on weekdays and from 2 a.m. to 5 a.m. on weekends. City Hall station in Camden  and 9/10th & Locust station in Philadelphia are closed overnight due to low ridership.

Cabin 

PATCO maintained the same interior styling in its vehicles from their introduction in 1969 through the end of the rebuilding process in 2018 with the 1980 PATCO II cars receiving the exact same look. The color combination was a base of cream with an avocado green fill. The rebuild replaced this with a grey and white interior with brighter fluorescent lighting.  Seating is a 2+2 arrangement, with half of the seats in each car facing the direction of travel, and half facing the opposite direction. Seats originally ran the full length of the car, with the front seats next to the operator's booth having the benefit of a large picture window. However, the newly refurbished cars now have full-width operator's cabs, resulting in the loss of four passenger seats, in addition to a number of folding longitudinal seats for ADA compliance.

Each PATCO car has a pair of doors on each side with a foyer area inside the doors for standing passengers. There are also hand-holds on all seat backs for standing passengers the entire length of the aisles. Car end-doors are unlocked, but inter-car movement is discouraged because of the extreme motions between cars. Interior cabs are halved to free up the space for passengers, however both cabs at the front and rear of any train are left in their full width configuration.

Refurbishment 
PATCO announced plans for the complete refurbishment of the entire fleet with work expected to begin in 2009. The contract for rebuilding the rolling stock was awarded to Alstom, at a cost of $194.2 million, beating Bombardier's bid by $35 million, though Bombardier claimed the contract was incorrectly awarded.  PATCO began to ship the railcars with their trucks removed and replaced with highway tires for the road trip to the Alstom facility in Hornell, New York, in March 2011.

The refurbishment consisted of a completely new interior with more modern colors, wheelchair access and more reliable HVAC systems. The rollsigns were replaced with digital displays, and the cars received automated announcements. These changes reduced seating by eight seats, from 160 to 152. The refurbishment also saw the replacement of the propulsion and automatic train operation systems, which used technology last updated in the early 1980s; the camshaft resistance type motor controller was replaced by a new solid state unit using IGBTs and the relay based ATO unit was replaced by a computerized system. The General Electric DC motors, Pioneer III trucks and gearboxes were not replaced, but rebuilt by Alstom as well. Also, Alstom purchased many extra GE 1255 A2 motors from retired Metro-North Railroad M-1A's from a scrap dealer in Ohio, and rebuilt them to provide PATCO with extra DC motors for future replacement if needed, or required. An automated announcement system was also installed with announcements recorded by Bernie Wagenblast.

The first rebuilt cars were redelivered to PATCO's Lindenwold, New Jersey Shops on November 12, 2013, and were tested accordingly before going into service. Rebuilt cars are being renumbered into the 1000 series instead of their former numbers. The former single unit cars were converted into married-pair type cars with the single-leaf door behind the train operators position removed and sealed-off. The rebuilding is expected to extend the lives of these cars by 20 years. The first four rebuilt cars were placed in revenue service on May 28, 2015, after over a year and a half of testing. Alstom proceeded with the rebuilding of the remaining fleet of cars at a production and delivery rate of 4 to 6 cars per month until all cars went through the rebuilding process.

The final run of the non-refurbished "legacy" trains took place on June 10, 2018, with a special day of "last rides" and a contest held for a rider to sit in the front row seat for the last ride. , the refurbishment work has been completed with a total of 120 of the previous 121 cars accepted back into service. The remaining single unit #116 was excluded from the rebuilding program due to having been damaged beyond repair by an arson fire in 1997 and subsequently used as a source of spare parts.

Signaling 
PATCO trains are governed by a Pulse code cab signaling system which transmits signal codes to the trains via the running rails. Wayside signals are located only at interlockings. Even when the Automatic Train Operation System is not in use, the cab signal speed control function is still enabled and if an operator goes above the permitted speed, the power is cut and the brakes are applied until the speed is back within the limit. The entire PATCO system is run from Center Tower, centrally located above a substation near the Broadway station in Camden.

Power 
All PATCO trains are electrically powered. Power comes from a top contact covered third rail at 750 V DC. There are two feeds from the commercial power grid, one located in Philadelphia from PECO Energy for the old Bridge Line tunnel segments and the other in New Jersey from PSE&G for the new mainline segments. In New Jersey power is distributed via wayside AC transmission lines in the 26.4 kV range and a series of 7 substations, located approximately every .

Fare collection 
PATCO was one of the first transit systems to employ automated fare collection and tickets with magnetically stored data. It currently uses two types of farecards: reusable contactless smart cards for frequent riders (Freedom Card) and magnetic stripe paper cards, valid for three days. PATCO has five different fare zones and it is necessary to retain one's ticket (or card) to exit the station at the proper zone. There is currently no discount for use of the stored value Freedom Card or for multi-ride paper tickets.  There are also no unlimited ride pass options, however a reduced fare Freedom Card is available for senior citizens and disabled riders.

Magnetic back tickets (1969–2006) 
At the start of service in 1969, PATCO used a system of plastic tickets with an oxide layer on the entire back side for the magnetic encoding of data. Tickets were pre-encoded with a number of rides and a destination zone and sold from ticket vending machines in each station. These machines only accepted coins so bill changers were placed in stations to support paper currency. Each ticket vending machine was capable of selling two types of tickets, which the rider chose by pushing a button after inserting the correct fare. Because the system has multiple fare zones, several machines were needed in each station. Stations in New Jersey had machines selling one way or round trip tickets to Philadelphia and machines selling tickets to other stations in New Jersey. Ticket machines in Philadelphia would sell single ride tickets to each of the four New Jersey fare zones with the Camden zone tickets also used for intra-Philadelphia travel. Used tickets with no remaining rides were retained by the faregates, re-encoded at a PATCO facility and returned to use in the vending machine. Ten-trip tickets could also be purchased through mail order or from ticket windows at select suburban stations.

At its inception, this system was state-of-the-art, but became increasingly problematic as they aged. Tickets were vulnerable to damage from magnetic sources and the equipment to read and code the farecards began to suffer from reliability problems with little replacement part availability. More importantly, the fare system could not accept payment cards and the reliance on change machines created an extra step for those needing to pay with paper currency.

Smart cards (2006–present) 

In July 2006, PATCO announced that it would start the transition from a magnetic ticket fare system to a contactless smart card system designed, built and integrated by Cubic Corporation, the firm responsible for the 1969 magnetic card system. Magnetic tickets are still sold however they are now in the form of disposable paper magnetic stripe cards that expire after 3 days. The new computer vending machines support payment cards. Additional ticket vending machines were installed at each station inside of fare control so that if a rider has purchased the wrong fare, they may pay the remaining fare to exit.

Connections to other transit systems

New Jersey Transit connections 
New Jersey Transit buses connect to most PATCO stations in New Jersey. The New Jersey Transit Atlantic City Line also stops at Lindenwold Station, and the River Line connects at Broadway Station (Walter Rand Transportation Center).

SEPTA connections 
The SEPTA (Southeastern Pennsylvania Transportation Authority) Market–Frankford Line connects to PATCO at the 8th & Market Station, which is two blocks away from SEPTA's Jefferson Station, where all but one of SEPTA's regional trains stop.

SEPTA's Broad Street Line connects to PATCO at the Walnut–Locust station via a short underground walkway to PATCO's 12th-13th & Locust, and 15-16th & Locust stations. The Broad-Ridge Spur connects to PATCO at the 8th & Market Station via a pedestrian walkway.

Formerly, a special "SEPTA Transfer" ticket could be purchased from the unpaid side of any New Jersey station. These tickets were sold for $3.50 ($1.75 per ride, a savings compared to a single $2.25 cash fare or a token for $2.00) and dispensed two paper receipts, one good for a ride within one hour of the time of purchase and another good for a ride within 24 hours of the time of purchase. Originally, both transfers were going to be valid for 24 hours, however, PATCO changed the time limit to prevent the unauthorized sale of PATCO transfers at Pennsylvania stations.

With the release of SEPTA Key, a new type of Freedom card is now required to purchase a transfer to the SEPTA system. The cost of a transfer is $2 with this system and it is debited directly from an account based Freedom Card account, provided a new Freedom Share card is used, which is compatible with both PATCO Freedom and SEPTA Key card systems.

Stations 
Some westbound trains skip Collingswood, Westmont, and Haddonfield during the morning rush hour.

In 2022, the DRPA completed the installation of more than 20 MW of solar panels at its facilities. The Lindenwold, Ashland, Woodcrest, and Ferry Avenue stations have large solar canopies covering their parking lots, built by TotalEnergies. The solar arrays provide electricity directly to the rail line and provide more than half of PATCO's electricity usage, making it the first solar-powered mass transit line in the U.S.

See also 

 Transportation in New Jersey
 Transportation in Philadelphia
 List of metro systems

Notes

References

External links 

 PATCO Official Website
 DRPA Official Website

 
Delaware River Port Authority
Electric railways in New Jersey
Electric railways in Pennsylvania
Railway lines opened in 1969
New Jersey railroads
Pennsylvania railroads
Pennsylvania-Reading Seashore Lines lines
Underground rapid transit in the United States
Standard gauge railways in the United States
1969 establishments in New Jersey
750 V DC railway electrification
1969 establishments in Pennsylvania